Thiepval Barracks in Lisburn, County Antrim, is the headquarters of the British Army in Northern Ireland and its 38th (Irish) Brigade.

History
The barracks were built in 1940. They are named after the village of Thiepval in Northern France, an important site in the Battle of the Somme and site of the Thiepval Memorial to the Missing of the Somme.

From 1954 the barracks contained the operational headquarters of No 31 Belfast Group Royal Observer Corps who operated from a protected nuclear bunker on Knox Road within Thiepval Barracks. Converted from a 1940s anti-aircraft operations room (AAOR) the bunker would support over one hundred ROC volunteers and a ten-man United Kingdom Warning and Monitoring Organisation warning team responsible for the famous four-minute warning in the event of a nuclear strike on the UK. The ROC would also detect radioactive fallout from the nuclear bursts and warn the public of approaching fallout. The two organisations were stood down at the end of the Cold War.

In early 1970 the barracks also became home to 39 Infantry Brigade and provided the headquarters for the Ulster Defence Regiment. The Brigade, as 39 Airportable Brigade, was involved in The Troubles in Northern Ireland, eventually taking on responsibility, under HQ Northern Ireland, for an area including Belfast and the eastern side of the province, but excluding the South Armagh border region. From September 1970, it was commanded by (then) Brigadier Frank Kitson.

On 7 October 1996 the Provisional Irish Republican Army penetrated the heavily fortified base to detonate two car bombs. The first detonated at 15:35 GMT followed by the second around ten minutes later close to the base's medical facilities where victims were gathering. Warrant Officer James Bradwell (43) was killed and 21 soldiers and 10 civilians were injured. This bombing was the first major attack on a military base in Northern Ireland since the ending of the IRA's ceasefire with the 1996 Docklands bombing.

The 39 Infantry Brigade took on some units from 3 Brigade when that brigade was disbanded on 1 September 2004. The HQ 8 Infantry Brigade based in Shackleton Barracks, Ballykelly, County Londonderry was disbanded and handed over responsibility to HQ 39 Infantry Brigade at Thiepval Barracks on 1 September 2006.

On 1 August 2007, the Brigade was amalgamated with 107 (Ulster) Brigade when the new non-deployable brigade HQ, the 38 (Irish) Brigade, was formed in the province.

The barracks remain home to 38th (Irish) Brigade.

Notes

Bibliography
 

Installations of the British Army
Military history of County Antrim
Barracks in Northern Ireland
Lisburn
Ulster Defence Regiment
The Troubles (Northern Ireland)
Military units and formations of the Cold War
Military history of Northern Ireland
1940 establishments in Northern Ireland